Paraclinus infrons, the Bald blenny, is a species of labrisomid blenny native to reefs of the Atlantic Ocean and the Caribbean Sea from Florida and the Bahamas over to Belize.

References

infrons
Fish described in 1960